Gabrovlje is a settlement on the left bank of the Dravinja River north of Slovenske Konjice in eastern Slovenia. The area is part of the traditional region of Styria. The entire Municipality of Slovenske Konjice is now included in the Savinja Statistical Region of Slovenia.

References

External links
Gabrovlje at Geopedia

Populated places in the Municipality of Slovenske Konjice